The 1849 Texas gubernatorial election was held on August 6, 1849 to elect the governor of Texas. Incumbent Governor George Tyler Wood was running for reelection, but was defeated by Peter Hansborough Bell, winning 40% of the vote to Bell's 48%.

Results

References

Gubernatorial
1849 United States gubernatorial elections
1849
August 1849 events